KPTB-DT, virtual and UHF digital channel 16, is a God's Learning Channel-affiliated television station licensed to Lubbock, Texas, United States. The station is owned by Prime Time Christian Broadcasting.

KPCB-DT (virtual and UHF digital channel 17) in Snyder serves as a satellite of KPTB-DT.

References

External links

God’s Learning Channel

Television channels and stations established in 1995
Television stations in Lubbock, Texas
Religious television stations in the United States
Television stations in Texas